Secure Flight is an airline passenger pre-screening program, implemented from August 2009 by the United States Transportation Security Administration (TSA).  Secure Flight matches passenger information against watch lists maintained by the federal government.  The initial implementation phase of Secure Flight resulted in the complete transfer of responsibility for passenger watch list matching to TSA from aircraft operators whose flights operate within the United States. The second phase of Secure Flight will result in the transfer of responsibility for passenger watch list matching to TSA for flights into, out of, and over the United States.

Secure Flight will serve to prevent individuals on the No Fly List from boarding an aircraft, as well as to subject individuals on the Selectee List to enhanced screening to determine if they are permitted to board an aircraft.

History
The Intelligence Reform and Terrorism Prevention Act (IRTPA) of 2004 requires the Department of Homeland Security (DHS) to assume from aircraft operators the function of conducting pre-flight comparisons of airline passenger information to federal government watch lists for international and domestic flights.  The final report of the National Commission on the Terrorist Attacks Upon the United States (9/11 Commission Report) recommends that this watch list matching function "should be performed by TSA and it should utilize the larger set of watch lists maintained by the Federal Government" (See 9/11 Commission Report p. 393).

To fulfill this recommendation, TSA published the Secure Flight Final Rule on October 28, 2008.  The Final Rule went into effect on December 29, 2008.

Benefits
Previously, individual aircraft operators conducted watch list matching using lists provided by TSA.  By assuming watch list matching responsibilities from the airlines, TSA will: 
 decrease the chance for compromised watch list data by limiting its distribution
 provide earlier identification of potential matches, allowing for expedited notification of law enforcement and threat management
 provide a fair, equitable, and consistent matching process across all airlines
 reduce instances of misidentified individuals
 offer consistent application of an expedited and integrated redress process for misidentified individuals via the Department of Homeland Security's Travel Redress Inquiry Program (DHS TRIP), a method by which misidentified travelers can file an inquiry to have erroneous information corrected in DHS systems

Implementation
Secure Flight began implementation with select domestic aircraft operators at the beginning of 2009 and completed implementation for all covered domestic and international airlines in December 2010.

TSA's Office of Threat Assessment and Credentialing is the lead for the program. Contractors supporting the program have included IBM, Accenture, ESR, InfoZen, and Deloitte. Infoglide Software provided the underlying identity resolution technology.

TSA's met its goal to vet 100 percent of all domestic commercial flights by early 2010 and 100 percent of all international commercial flights by the end of 2010.

Privacy
TSA has stated it will not collect or use commercial data to conduct Secure Flight watch list matching. It has also released a Privacy Impact Assessment (PIA).  The TSA policy, however, makes no mention of any limitations on what the airlines themselves, who collect the sensitive (birth date, etc.) information, may do with this.

Secure Flight has many similarities with CAPPS II and the No Fly List, and therefore raises the same validated concerns about civil liberties and due process. Specifically, civil libertarians argue that under the Secure Flight program, there are insufficient redress mechanisms for innocent citizens on watch lists. Additionally, the content and quantity of the watch lists has fallen under scrutiny.

See also
 Airport security
 No Fly List
 Multistate Anti-Terrorism Information Exchange
 Travel technology

Sources
This article incorporates text verbatim from this website, a publication of the US Transportation Security Administration, in the public domain.

External links
 Secure Flight Home Page
 Official DHS Press Release
 Secure Flight FAQ (The Identity Project / PapersPlease.org)
 ACLU Response to Secure Flight Final Rule Announcement
 USA Today Coverage of Secure Flight Final Rule Announcement
 Secure Flight Privacy Impact Assessment (PIA)
 Secure Flight System of Records Notice (SORN)
 DHS Traveler Redress Inquiry Program (DHS TRIP)
  The Final Rule
 Carrier Data Interfacing to Secure Flight

Identity documents of the United States
Aviation in the United States
Counterterrorism in the United States
Aviation security
Transportation Security Administration